The Khasi Hills is a low mountain formation on the Shillong Plateau in Meghalaya state of India. The Khasi Hills are part of the Garo-Khasi-Jaintia range and connects with the Purvanchal Range and larger Patkai Range further east. Khasi Hills, and the whole Garo-Khasi-Jaintia range, are in the Meghalaya subtropical forests ecoregion.

Khasi Hills, and the entire Meghalaya state was administratively part of Assam before 1970. In older sources in particular, the alternative transcription Khasia Hills is seen.

The region is inhabited mainly by tribal Khasi dwellers, which are traditionally in various chieftainships, states known as the Khasi Hill States. One of its capitals, Sohra, is considered one of the wettest places in the world.
The majority of Khasis are Presbyterians followed by Catholics and Anglicans.

The region came under the Khasi Hills district, which was divided into West Khasi Hills and East Khasi Hills districts on 28 October 1976.

It is situated a few kilometers south of Shillong town.

Administration 

Administratively, the Khasi Hills used to be a part of the Khasi Hills district. The district was divided into East Khasi Hills district and West Khasi Hills district on 28 October 1976. On 4 June 1992, the Ri-Bhoi District was carved out of the East Khasi Hills District.

Demographics
The population of the region according to the 2011 Census is 1,468,223.

Religion

A vast majority of 1,128,769 people in Khasi Hills follow Christianity of various denominations mostly Presbyterian and Catholic. Hinduism is mainly followed by 182,353 people mainly Non-Tribals  (Bengalis, Nepalis, Biharis, Marwaris etc) living in the region. A small segments of khasi tribe numbering around 127,735 still follow their own indigenous tribal Religion called "Ka Niam Khasi", Islam is a tiny minority with around 17,471 people following it. While 0.81 percent follow other religions.

Language

Khasi is spoken by 1,149,178 people as their mother tongue, Garo is
spoken by 88,533. While Bengali and Nepali came under 3th and 4th position and is spoken by 56,086 and 48,010 people. A vast number Non tribals can only be found in multi-diverse East Khasi Hills district.

See also
Garo Hills
Khasi and Jaintia Hills
Patkai

References

Further reading

Hills of Meghalaya
Tourism in Northeast India